Bruno Mauricio Lemiechevsky Melessi (born 3 March 1994), also known as Bruno Melessi, is a Spanish professional footballer of Belarusian, Spanish and Uruguayan ancestry. As of 2022, he plays for Spanish club Santanyí.

Career
Lemiechevsky spent his youth football years playing in lower Catalonia-based Spanish leagues. While visiting his relatives in Belarus in 2015, he was recruited by Slavia Mozyr and joined them officially since 2016.

From August 2018 he plays for Lithuanian „Atlantas“ in A lyga.
In first match scored goal against FK Jonava.

On 2020 season he joined to Inter Club d'Escaldes.

ON 6 January 2021, Lemiechevsky signed for Spanish club CP Villarrobledo.

Personal life
Due to having Belarusian ancestry, born in Uruguay and having Spanish citizenship, he is eligible to represent for Belarus, Spain and Uruguay.

References

External links 
 
 Profile at Andorran Football Federation
 Profile at Slavia Mozyr website

1994 births
Living people
Footballers from Montevideo
Spanish people of Belarusian descent
Spanish people of Uruguayan descent
Uruguayan people of Belarusian descent
Uruguayan people of Spanish descent
Spanish footballers
Uruguayan footballers
Association football forwards
Segunda División B players
Tercera División players
Primera Catalana players
Cerdanyola del Vallès FC players
FC Slavia Mozyr players
UE Vilassar de Mar players
Belarusian Premier League players
A Lyga players
FK Atlantas players
Primera Divisió players
UE Sant Julià players
Inter Club d'Escaldes players
Spanish expatriate footballers
Expatriate footballers in Belarus
Expatriate footballers in Lithuania
Expatriate footballers in Andorra